Oleg Ivenko (Ukrainian:Олег Івенко) (born August 14, 1996) is a Ukrainian ballet dancer and actor, known for his portrayal of Rudolph Nureyev in the film The White Crow.  He is a principal dancer with the Tatar State Opera in Kazan.

Born in Kharkiv, Ukraine, Ivenko graduated from the Kharkov Choreographic School in 2006 and from the Belarusian State Choreographic College in 2010.

His role in The White Crow was his film debut.

In 2020, Ivenko was awarded the Leonide Massine Prize in Positano, Italy in the category "Best Dancer of the Year on the International Stage".

References

External links
Oleg Ivenko biography at Berin Iglesias Art
Oleg Ivenko biography at State Opera of Tatarstan website

"From Russia with Love: Oleg Ivenko talks about playing Ruldolf Nureyev in ‘The White Crow’" by David Jenkins Retrieved March 27, 2021

Ukrainian male ballet dancers
1996 births
Actors from Kharkiv
Living people
Dancers from Kharkiv